Kingri is a Tehsil of Khairpur District in the Sindh province of Pakistan, it is administratively subdivided into 10 Union Councils.
Word kingri is taken from "keenger", "keenger" means clay utensils or clay pots, cause in earlier times in the south of current city Pir Jo Goth there used to live tribes of Kumhar People (Kumbher in Sindhi) who used to make clay pots. Taluka Kingri's headquarters is Pir Jo Goth, According to Nabi Bux Khan Baloch city was founded on 3 October 1883. According to 2017 census, the population of Taluka is about 340,218, with 56,915 households.

Taluka Kingri, Khairpur Mir's Sindh

References

Populated places in Khairpur District
Talukas of Sindh